The Echo School, located at 3441 S. Echo Rd., in Echo, Utah is a historic two-room schoolhouse that was built in 1914 and used as a school into the 1940s.  It was listed on the National Register of Historic Places in 1997.

It's a one-story building with a hipped roof in a rural setting.  The building was moved to make way for a highway developed in 1955;  it was then placed on a concrete foundation and otherwise improved.  It was then used for community functions and as a Veterans of Foreign Wars meeting hall.  It was used less in those ways from about 1970 on.

It was deemed significant in 1997 as Echo's only surviving purpose-built school.

References

School buildings on the National Register of Historic Places in Utah
Neoclassical architecture in Utah
School buildings completed in 1914
Former school buildings in the United States
National Register of Historic Places in Summit County, Utah
1914 establishments in Utah
Relocated buildings and structures in Utah
Schools in Summit County, Utah